Victoria Viaduct, originally known as the Victoria Bridge, is a stone arch rail viaduct spanning the River Wear about  south-east of Washington in North East England.  It was built as part of the Durham Junction Railway under the supervision of Thomas Elliot Harrison.

History and design
The bridge was constructed as part of the Durham Junction Railway, which had been sanctioned by act of parliament in 1834; the act allowed for traffic tolls on a bridge over the Wear, including tolls for road and foot crossing. A  iron bridge suitable for passage by rail, foot and road vehicle was designed by John Green of Newcastle, but instead a stone arch bridge designed by James Walker was chosen. The contract to build the bridge was given to John Gibb & Son. of Aberdeen.

The design was based upon the Alcántara Bridge in Spain. Construction began 17 March 1836 and was completed on 28 June 1838, the date of the coronation of Queen Victoria; as a result it was called 'Victoria Bridge'. The cost of construction was £40,338 5s. 10d.

The viaduct carried a double track railway, and had a walkway on either side for pedestrians.

The main arches were semicircular with the exception of the main 160 ft span, which was a circular segment, spanning 160 ft with a rise of 72 ft. Above the first  the piers contained voids to minimise mass.

The bridge and line opened in August 1838. As built it was one of the largest bridges in Europe, being exceeded in arch length by the River Dee bridge at Chester, and in height by the Alcántara bridge, but not by other structures in both dimensions.

Scheduled passenger trains on the line and viaduct ceased in 1964 following the Beeching Axe. The bridge continued to carry freight, and was renovated in 1989/90. Diverted passenger trains also used it occasionally, especially while the East Coast Main Line was being electrified. After closure of the freight terminal at  Follingsby in 1991 the line and bridge were mothballed. The structure was grade II* listed in 1985.

See also
Leamside line

Notes

Further reading

Notes

References

External links

Bridges across the River Wear
Bridges completed in 1838
Railway viaducts in Tyne and Wear
Transport in the City of Sunderland
Grade II* listed buildings in Tyne and Wear
Former railway bridges in the United Kingdom
Grade II* listed railway bridges and viaducts